William Howard Arnold (January 18, 1901 – September 30, 1976) was a lieutenant general in the United States Army.

Early life

Arnold was born in Dyersburg, Tennessee on January 18, 1901.  In 1924 he graduated from the United States Military Academy.

Early career
Assigned to the Infantry, Arnold served in assignments throughout the United States.  In 1928 he graduated from the Infantry Officer Course.  From 1928 to 1930 he was assigned to Schofield Barracks, Hawaii.

Arnold was assigned as Training and Operations Officer, S-3, for the 15th Infantry Regiment in Tientsin, China from 1934 to 1936.

In 1938 he graduated from the Command and General Staff College.

World War II
From 1942 to 1943 Arnold was Assistant Chief of Staff for Training and Operations, G-3, of the IV Corps, headquartered at Fort Lewis, Washington.

Arnold was promoted to brigadier general in September, 1943 and assigned as Chief of Staff of the XIV Corps, supervising the planning and execution of combat operations in Guadalcanal, New Georgia, and Bougainville.

Arnold was promoted to major general in November, 1944 and assigned to command the 23rd (Americal) Infantry Division.  He served until the division was deactivated in December, 1945, leading it during combat operations in the Southern Philippines.  In August, 1945 Arnold accepted the surrender of the Japanese occupying Cebu Island.

Post-World War II
Arnold continued his Army service after the war.  From 1950 to 1952 he served as commander of the Joint Military Mission for Aid to Turkey (JMMAT).

In 1953 Arnold was assigned as commander, of U.S. Forces Austria, receiving promotion to lieutenant general and serving until 1955.

Arnold was named commander of the 5th United States Army headquartered in Chicago, Illinois in 1955, where he served until his 1961 retirement.

Awards and decorations
General Arnold's honors included multiple awards of the Distinguished Service Medal including two for World War II, the Silver Star, two awards of the Legion of Merit, two Bronze Stars and the Air Medal.

Family, retirement, and death
With his wife, Elizabeth Welsh (Mullen), he was the father of nuclear fuel executive William Howard Arnold, Colonel Joseph Coleman Arnold,(1964 USMA), Elizabeth A Dallman, Emily A Clancy, and the grandfather of Nobel Prize-winning scientist and engineer Frances Arnold.

In retirement Arnold remained in the Chicago area.  He died in Lake Forest, Illinois on September 30, 1976.  He is buried at Fort Sheridan, Illinois, next to his wife Elizabeth (1905–1976), who was named a Grand Cross Dame of the Order of the Holy Sepulchre in 1955.

References

External links

Generals of World War II

|-

1901 births
United States Military Academy alumni
United States Army Command and General Staff College alumni
Recipients of the Distinguished Service Medal (US Army)
Recipients of the Silver Star
Recipients of the Legion of Merit
Recipients of the Air Medal
People from Dyersburg, Tennessee
People from Chicago
1976 deaths
United States Army generals of World War II
United States Army generals
Military personnel from Tennessee